Blackberry Blossom is an album by American guitarist Norman Blake, released in 1977.

Reception

Writing for Allmusic, critic Ronnie D. Lankford, Jr. noted that Blake "imbeds himself in tradition, offering honest interpretations and fresh originals that are respectful of their roots. In this way, his true artistry grows each time the listener places a disc like Blackberry Blossom in the CD player. To those familiar with Blake, this re-issue will be warmly welcomed; for the unfamiliar, Blackberry Blossom is a great place to get started."

Track listing 
 "Are You from Dixie?" (George L. Cobb, Jack Yellen) – 3:40
"The Rights Of Man Hornpipe" – 2:35
"The Highland Light" (Blake) – 5:16
"Railroad Blues" (Traditional) – 8:02
"Foggy Valley" (Traditional) – 2:31
"Lonesome Jenny" (Blake) – 7:21
"Blackberry Blossom" (Traditional) – 3:33
"D Medley" (Traditional) – 5:26
"Jerusalem Ridge" (Monroe) – 3:46

Personnel
Norman Blake – guitar, mandolin, violin, vocals
Nancy Blake – guitar, cello
Production notes
Dr. Toby Mountain – mastering

References

1977 albums
Norman Blake (American musician) albums